This is a list of events in lesbian, gay, bisexual and transgender (LGBT) history in Germany.

Ancient 

 98 – Germanic tribes executing homosexuals and sinking them into swamps are reported by Tacitus. The remains of such corpses have been found in Denmark and Northern Germany. Some were strangled to death before being drowned, while others were drowned alive.
 ca. 500 – As the Germanic tribes living south of Scandinavia convert to Christianity their views are confirmed by the Roman Catholic condemnation of homosexuality. However, rather than adopting church- inspired edicts, they maintain their own legal practices.

Medieval and early modern periods
ca. 800 – Several laws against homosexual acts are put into effect in the Holy Roman Empire by the Frankish king Charlemagne. His son and successor Louis the Pious is especially homophobic, blaming Noah's flood on homosexuals and endorsing St. Paul's call for the death penalty.
1007 – The Decretum of Burchard of Worms equates homosexual acts with other sexual transgressions such as adultery and argues, therefore, that it should have the same penance (generally fasting).

1328 – The German Law Book for Town and Country calls for burning at the stake of all lesbians and gay men within the towns and cities of the Holy Roman Empire. In practice though, milder sentences are sometimes carried out, especially for aristocrats: rapid execution (decapitation by sword) followed by burning. In most cases, all documents concerning the trial are also burned to expunge every trace of the deed, whose very mention is labeled sinful. Sodomy, a word not to be uttered among Christian folk, is linked with heresy.
1493 – Hartmann Schedel illustrates Sodom and Gomorrah in Nuremberg Chronicle. The Book of Genesis 18 and 19 describes the destruction of Sodom as punishment for homosexuality.
 1532 – Holy Roman Empire makes sodomy punishable by death.

17th century

1615 – Peter Paul Rubens paints "The Flight of Lot and his Family from Sodom."
 1620 – Brandenburg-Prussia criminalizes sodomy, making it punishable by death.

18th century
 1721 – Catharina Margaretha Linck is the last woman executed for female sodomy in what is Germany today.
 1746 – Frederick the Great of the Kingdom of Prussia suspends use of the death penalty for sodomy. 
 1794 – The Kingdom of Prussia officially abolishes the death penalty for sodomy. Long prison sentences with hard labour replace death as the punishment for homosexuality.

19th century
1852 – Johann Ludwig Casper writes an article about homosexuality known under the title, Über Nothzucht und Päderastie und deren Ermittlung Seitens des Gerichtsarztes.
1854 – Wilhelm Gollmann writes about homosexuality in the Homeopathic Guide to all Diseases Urinary and Sexual Organs.
1859 – Arthur Schopenhauer briefly writes about homosexuality in the chapter on the Metaphysics of Love in his third edition of The World as Will and Representation.
 1864 – Lawyer Karl Heinrich Ulrichs confesses, under the pseudonym Numa Numantius, his secret homosexual inclinations in his first two books in the 12 book series entitled, Forschungen über das Räthsel der mannmännlichen Liebe (Researches on the Riddle of Male-Male Love). He proposes a concept of third gender identity through the term, urning.
 1864 – Johann Ludwig Casper dedicated his third chapter on homosexuality in the first part of the Special Divisions section in the third edition (third volume) of A Handbook of the Practice of Forensic Medicine.
 1867 – On August 29, 1867, Karl Heinrich Ulrichs became the first self-proclaimed homosexual to speak out publicly for homosexual rights when he pleaded at the Congress of German Jurists in Munich for a resolution urging the repeal of anti-homosexual laws.
 1869 – The term "homosexuality" appears in print for the first time in a German-Hungarian pamphlet written by Karl-Maria Kertbeny (1824–1882).
1870 – Friedrich Christian Oppenhoff mentions Paragraph 175 in Das Strafgesetzbuch für den Norddeutschen Bund.
 1871 – Homosexuality is criminalized throughout the German Empire by Paragraph 175 of the Reich Criminal Code. Homosexuality was already a criminal offence in all territories of Germany, but it was regulated by the state authorities separately.
 1896 First worldwide gay magazine Der Eigene by Adolf Brand starts in Berlin.
 1897 Founding of the Scientific-Humanitarian Committee. The first gay rights movement in history.

20th century

1901–1930

 1903 - Advocating organisation Gemeinschaft der Eigenen was founded in Berlin.
 1906 – Brazilian countess Dina Alma de Paradeda poisons herself in Breslau, and a doctor reveals that her body was male, causing a media sensation. De Paradeda becomes one of the first transgender women known by name in the entirety of central Europe. Her history is later often recalled by Dr. Hirschfeld in his research and works.
 1907 – Adolf Brand, the activist leader of the Gemeinschaft der Eigenen working to overturn Paragraph 175, publishes a piece "outing" the Imperial Chancellor of Germany, Prince Bernhard von Bülow. The Prince sues Brand for libel; Brand is sentenced to 18 months in prison.
 1907–1909 – Harden-Eulenburg Affair in Germany
 1919 – In Berlin, Germany, Doctor Magnus Hirschfeld co-founds the Institut für Sexualwissenschaft (Institute for Sex Research), a pioneering private research institute and counseling office. Its library of thousands of books was destroyed by Nazis in May, 1933.
 1919 – Different from the Others, one of the first explicitly gay films, is released. Magnus Hirschfeld has a cameo in the film and partially funded its production.
 1919 - In August, gay magazine Die Freundschaft is started by publisher Karl Schulz in Berlin. 
 1919 –  The Bund für Menschenrecht (BfM), a gay rights organisation, is founded in Berlin under the name Deutscher Freundschaftsverband (DFV).
1920 – Courts in Berlin and Leipzig judge the collection of short stories about sexually charged encounters between men authored by Granand indecent and order all copies destroyed.
 1922 – Dora Richter becomes the first transgender woman to undergo gender reassignment surgery in Hirschfeld's Institute, the first operation of its kind in the world.
 1924 - First worldwide lesbian magazine Die Freundin in Berlin starts.
 1929 – On October 16, a Reichstag Committee votes to repeal Paragraph 175.  The Social Democrats and other leftist parties backed the repeal, while the Catholic Center party and other right-wing parties opposed the repeal.  The Nazis' rise to power prevents the implementation of the vote.

1931–1970

 1931 – Mädchen in Uniform, one of the first explicitly lesbian films and the first pro-lesbian film, is released.

 1933 – The Nazi Party bans homosexual groups. Homosexuals are sent to concentration camps. Nazis burn the library of Magnus Hirschfeld's Institute for Sexual Research, and destroy the Institute.
 1937 – The first use of the pink triangle for gay men in Nazi concentration camps.
 1945 – Upon the liberation of Nazi concentration camps by Allied forces, those interned for homosexuality are not freed, but required to serve out the full term of their sentences under Paragraph 175
 1950 – East Germany partially abrogates the Nazis' emendations to Paragraph 175.
 1951 – Die Freunde, a homophile magazine, is published by Johannes Dörrast. In 1952, it is renamed  Freond and its content edited to avoid local censorship. This was unsuccessful and the magazine was no longer viable by 1952.
 1968 – Paragraph 175 is eased in East Germany decriminalizing homosexual acts over the age of 18.
 1969 – Paragraph 175 is eased in West Germany.

1971–2000
 1974 – General Gay Association, the second openly LGBT rights organization in German history, is established.
 1985 – Herbert Rusche becomes the first openly gay member of the Bundestag.
 1987 – Jutta Oesterle-Schwerin becomes the first openly lesbian member of the Bundestag.
 1994 – After German reunifaction, the Supreme Court rules that the age of consent for sex must be equalized, although its unclear what part of the Constitution the court based its ruling.
 1994 - On June 11, Germany deletes the Paragraph 175 StGB (Strafgesetzbuch), which under changing conditions made sexual acts between men a punishable crime. 
 2000 – The Bundestag officially apologizes to gays and lesbians persecuted under the Nazi regime, and for "harm done to homosexual citizens up to 1969".

21st century
 2001 – Germany recognizes civil partnerships for same-sex couples (without joint adoption until Oct 2004, then with step-adoption); Klaus Wowereit becomes the first openly gay politician elected mayor of Berlin (and, by virtue of Berlin's status as a state, one of the two first openly gay premier of a German state; also makes Berlin the largest city in the world with an openly gay mayor); Ole von Beust becomes the first openly gay mayor of Hamburg.
 2004 – Same-sex stepchild adoption is legalized; Guido Westerwelle, leader of the FDP, becomes the first leader of a major party to come out.
 2008 – On May 27, the Memorial to the Homosexual Victims of Nazi Persecution is handed over to the public in Berlin. 
 2009 – Westerwelle becomes the first openly gay member of the Federal Cabinet (Vice Chancellor and Foreign Minister under Angela Merkel coalition government).
 2013 – Barbara Hendricks becomes the first openly lesbian member of the Federal Cabinet (Federal Minister for the Environment, Nature Conservation and Nuclear Safety  under Angela Merkel's coalition government)
 2017 – In June 2017 the pardoning of men convicted in the postwar era under Paragraph 175 was passed by law in the Bundestag. One week later, a majority of Bundestag MPs voted in favor of a bill legalizing same-sex marriage in Germany and granting homosexual couples full adoption rights.
2019 – Conversion therapy is completely banned for minors and partially banned for adults in December 2019.
 2021 - In May a bill passes the Bundestag that provides compensation to LGBT servicepeople in the military for past discrimination and harassment.

See also
 LGBT rights in Germany
Violence against LGBT people
Homophobia

References

Further reading